Albertopolis is the nickname given to the area centred on Exhibition Road in London, named after Prince Albert, consort of Queen Victoria. It contains many educational and cultural sites. It is in South Kensington, split between the Royal Borough of Kensington and Chelsea and the City of Westminster (the border running along Imperial College Road), and the area bordered by Cromwell Road to the south and Kensington Road to the north.

Institutions

Institutions in and around Albertopolis include:

Imperial College London
Natural History Museum
Royal Albert Hall
Royal College of Art
Royal College of Music
Royal Geographical Society
Royal Institute of Navigation
Science Museum
Victoria and Albert Museum
Albert Memorial

The following were originally institutions in their own right:

City & Guilds College, now Imperial College's Faculty of Engineering
Geological Museum, now a subsidiary of the Natural History Museum
Royal College of Science, now Imperial College's Faculty of Natural Sciences
Royal School of Mines, now a part of Imperial College's Faculty of Engineering

Institutions formerly in Albertopolis include:

Royal College of Organists, from 1904 to 1991.
Royal School of Naval Architecture, from 1864 to 1873.
Royal School of Needlework, from 1903 to 1987.
Imperial Institute, later Commonwealth Institute, from 1893 to 1962.

More recent additions to Albertopolis include:

Polish Hearth Club from 1939
Polish Institute and Sikorski Museum from 1945
Ismaili Centre

History
Following the advice of Prince Albert the area was purchased by the Royal Commission for the Exhibition of 1851 with the profits made from the Great Exhibition of 1851, which was held in a site in Hyde Park nearby to the north-east. This is commemorated in the name of the principal north–south street laid out on their estate, Exhibition Road.

Prince Albert was a driving force behind the Great Exhibition and President of the Royal Commission, and the name "Albertopolis" seems to have been coined in the 1850s to celebrate and somewhat satirise his role in Victorian cultural life.  After his death the term fell into disuse, and the area was more widely referred to as South Kensington.  It was revived by architectural historians in the 1960s and popularised by the nascent conservation movement to bring attention to the complex of public Victorian buildings and the surrounding houses built on the Commissioners' estate, that were threatened with demolition by the expansion and redevelopment plans of Imperial College. Among the buildings threatened was the Imperial Institute, designed by T. E. Collcutt.

Overview
There is a central axis between the Albert Memorial in Kensington Gardens to the north and the central portal of the south façade of the Natural History Museum. The Royal Albert Hall, Royal College of Music, the former tower of the otherwise-demolished Imperial Institute (now the Queen's Tower of Imperial College London) and the 1950s rear extension to the Science Museum are all aligned on this axis, which cannot be seen on the ground. This regular geometric alignment of Albertopolis can be observed readily only from the balconies of the Queen's Tower (very rarely open to visitors), although the northern part can be glimpsed from the top floor of the Science Museum.

The closest tube station is South Kensington, linked to the museums by the South Kensington Subway, a tiled tunnel beneath Exhibition Road constructed in 1885. The subway was originally intended to go as far as the Royal Albert Hall, but the construction of the Imperial Institute meant the tunnel emerged at the Science Museum where it exits onto Exhibition Road. Originally only opened during exhibitions in South Kensington, it was opened to the public free of charge in 1908. The subway is Grade II listed.

There are also two research libraries in the area, the Dana Centre, part of the Science Museum, and Imperial College's Central Library, located on Queen's Lawn.

See also
 Charles Wentworth Dilke
 Exhibition Road
 Henry Cole
 Museum Lane
 Serpentine Gallery in Hyde Park to the north

References

External links
Albertopolis online exhibition, from the Royal Institute of British Architects
Architectural Tour of Exhibition Road and 'Albertopolis'  from the Victoria and Albert Museum
Royal Commission for the Exhibition of 1851
Survey of London: volume 38: South Kensington Museums Area  F. H. W. Sheppard (editor). Originally published by the Athlone Press for the Greater London Council, 1975. Available online as part of British History Online.
Walking tour of Albertopolis Podcast, PDF and map.

Areas of London
Museum districts in the United Kingdom
Great Exhibition
Tourist attractions in the Royal Borough of Kensington and Chelsea
Tourist attractions in the City of Westminster
South Kensington